Chilvers Coton was a railway station on the Coventry to Nuneaton Line, which served the Chilvers Coton area of Nuneaton, south of the town centre. It opened in 1850, along with the line, and was closed in 1965 when passenger services on the route were withdrawn. 

It was located in a cutting, just north of the point where the railway passed under College Street.

The station was originally opened by the London and North Western Railway (LNWR) it came under the ownership of the London, Midland and Scottish Railway (LMS) in 1922, and then British Railways in 1948. It was closed under the Beeching Axe.

References

 Hurst, Geoffrey (1993). LNWR Branch Lines of West Leicestershire & East Warwickshire (First ed.). Milepost Publications. .

External links
 Chilvers Coton Station on Warwickshire Railways.com

Disused railway stations in Warwickshire
Beeching closures in England
Railway stations in Great Britain opened in 1850
Railway stations in Great Britain closed in 1965
Former London and North Western Railway stations